Vaigat may refer to a number of entities:

 Sullorsuaq Strait
 Country style within music of Greenland